Gyliauchenidae is a family of trematodes belonging to the order Plagiorchiida.

Genera

Genera:
 Affecauda Hall & Chambers, 1999
 Apharyngogyliauchen Yamaguti, 1942
 Endochortophagus Huston, Miller, Cutmore & Cribb, 2019

References

Plagiorchiida